Johann Sebastian Bach composed the church cantata  (Only upon You, Lord Jesus Christ), in Leipzig in 1724 for the thirteenth Sunday after Trinity and first performed it on 3 September 1724. The chorale cantata is based on the hymn "Allein zu dir, Herr Jesu Christ" by Konrad Hubert (1540).

History and words 
Bach composed the cantata in his second year in Leipzig for the 13th Sunday after Trinity. That year, Bach composed a cycle of chorale cantatas, begun on the first Sunday after Trinity of 1724. The prescribed readings for the Sunday were from the Epistle to the Galatians, Paul's teaching on law and promise, and from the Gospel of Luke, the parable of the Good Samaritan.

The cantata is based on the hymn by Konrad Hubert which was published in Nürnberg in 1540 with an added fourth stanza. Each of the stanzas consists of nine lines. For the cantata text, an unknown poet kept the words of stanzas 1 and 4 unchanged for movements 1 and 6. He transcribed the ideas of the inner stanzas, each to a sequence of recitative and aria. Due to the splitting of each stanza in two movements, the paraphrasing is a more independent from the original than for the previous cantatas of the cycle, last . The hymn, concentrating on the sinner asking Jesus for redemption, is only generally connected to the Gospel. The poet connects to the Gospel in movement 4, "" (Of your mercy grant me / the true Christian faith), addressing God as the true "Good Samaritan", also in movement 5, "" (Grant that my purest impulse may be / to love my neighbour as myself"), citing the central line of the parable.

The chorale melody "" of unknown authorship was documented in a 1541 Wittenberg publication. It was used extensively, for example by Sethus Calvisius and Michael Praetorius. According to Klaus Hofmann, it was composed in 1512 for a secular song by Paul Hofhaimer. In the cantata, Bach uses the melody completely in a chorale fantasia in movement 1 and in the closing chorale, while he alludes to it in movement 5, a duet.

Bach first performed the cantata on 3 September 1724.

Scoring and structure 
The cantata in six movements is scored for three vocal soloists—alto, tenor and bass—a four-part choir, two oboes, two violins, viola, and basso continuo.

Music 
In his first year in Leipzig, Bach had composed for the same occasion , opening with a chorus on important law, on which, according to the parallel , "hang all the law and the prophets": "You shall love God, your Lord, with all your heart, with all your soul, with all your strength and with all your mind, and your neighbor as yourself".

The opening chorus of "" is a chorale fantasia, with the cantus firmus in the soprano, the lower voices singing mostly homophonic, but occasionally in polyphony, and expansive ritornellos framing all nine lines of the hymn. John Eliot Gardiner notes: the fineness of the gemstone, the choral delivery of Konrad Hubert's nine-lined hymn, is in constant danger of being eclipsed by the ornate beauty of its orchestral setting, energetic in its forward propulsion, motivic invention and proto-symphonic development, through its nine instrumental ritornellos, ranging from five to twenty-four bars.

In the alto aria, movement 3, "" (How fearful were my shaky steps), fearfulness is expressed by the muted first violins and pizzicato in the other strings, while the shaky steps appear in syncopated lines. Gardiner notes the aria's similarity to the soprano aria "" (How the thoughts of the sinner tremble and waver) in Bach's cantata , composed for then 9th Sunday after Trinity the previous year. Movement 5, a duet of tenor and bass "" (God, whose name is love), depicts God's love in "almost naive-sounding parallel sixths and thirds", consonances in "unanimity of movement" being an image of unity that would be understood by the audience at the time. In contrast, Bach sets the words "" (should enemies disturb my peace) in lively syncopated motion, "peace" in long notes. The closing chorale is a four-part setting of the melody, with a rich setting of the words "" (the father of all goodness ... who may constantly preserve us) and "" (in eternity), described by Gardiner as "an admirable melismatic interweaving of all four vocal lines at cadential points".

Recordings 
 J. S. Bach: Cantatas BWV 33 & BWV 95, Hans Heintze, Bremer Domchor & Bremer Bach-Orchester, Eva Bornemann, Georg Jelden, Roland Kunz, Cantate/Vanguard 1962
 J. S. Bach: Das Kantatenwerk – Sacred Cantatas Vol. 2, Gustav Leonhardt, Knabenchor Hannover, Leonhardt-Consort, René Jacobs, Marius van Altena, Max van Egmond, Teldec 1974
 Bach Cantatas Vol. 4 – Sundays after Trinity I, Karl Richter, Münchener Bach-Chor, Münchener Bach-Orchester, Julia Hamari, Peter Schreier, Dietrich Fischer-Dieskau, Archiv Produktion 1976
 Die Bach Kantate Vol. 49, Helmuth Rilling, Gächinger Kantorei, Bach-Collegium Stuttgart, Helen Watts, Frieder Lang. Philippe Huttenlocher, Hänssler 1979
 Bach Edition Vol. 4 – Cantatas Vol. 1, Pieter Jan Leusink, Holland Boys Choir, Netherlands Bach Collegium, Sytse Buwalda, Knut Schoch, Bas Ramselaar, Brilliant Classics 1999
 Bach Cantatas Vol. 6: Köthen/Frankfurt, John Eliot Gardiner, Monteverdi Choir, English Baroque Soloists, Nathalie Stutzmann, Christoph Genz, Jonathan Brown, Soli Deo Gloria 2000
 J. S. Bach: Complete Cantatas Vol. 13, Ton Koopman, Amsterdam Baroque Orchestra & Choir, Franziska Gottwald, Paul Agnew, Klaus Mertens, Antoine Marchand 2000
 J. S. Bach: Cantatas Vol. 24 – Cantatas from Leipzig 1724, Masaaki Suzuki, Bach Collegium Japan, Robin Blaze, Gerd Türk, Peter Kooy, BIS 2002

References

External links 
 
 Allein zu dir, Herr Jesu Christ BWV 33; BC A 127 / Chorale cantata (13th Sunday after Trinity) Bach Digital
 Cantata BWV 33 Allein zu dir, Herr Jesu Christ: history, scoring, sources for text and music, translations to various languages, discography, discussion, Bach Cantatas Website
 Luke Dahn: BWV 33.6 bach-chorales.com

Church cantatas by Johann Sebastian Bach
1724 compositions
Chorale cantatas